Rust is an English surname. It comes from the Old English "rust" which meant "red" and was originally used as a nickname for those with red hair.

People
 Albert Rust (1818–1870), American politician
 Albert Rust (footballer) (born 1953), French footballer
 Alfred Rust (1900–1983), German archaeologist and prehistorian
 Annie Coolidge Rust, 19th-century American educator 
 Bernhard Rust (1883–1945), Minister of Education in Nazi Germany
 Bryan Rust (born 1992), American ice hockey player
 Elizabeth Lownes Rust (1835–1899), American philanthropist, humanitarian, Christian missionary
 Friedrich Wilhelm Rust (1739–1796), German violinist and composer
 Giacomo Rust (1741–1786), Italian composer
 John Rust (born 1955), American economist
 Mathias Rust (born 1968), German pilot who landed on the Red Square in 1987
 Paul Rust (born 1981), American actor
 Richard S. Rust (1815–1906), American abolitionist and educator
 Rod Rust (1928–2018), American football coach
 Wilhelm Karl Rust (1787–1855), German pianist
 Yvonne Rust (1922 – 2002), New Zealand potter

References

Surnames